Zemljotres (Cyrillic: Земљотрес, English: Earthquake) is an album by Bosnian Serb singer Mile Kitić. It was released in 2004.

Track listing
Svi su tu
Potroši se ljubav
Zemljotres
Ti nisi čista
Svako slovo lagala je
Milioni, kamioni
U mojim venama
Kad jednom ljubav ubiješ
Da sam tebi jedan bio
Zemljotres [remix]

References

2004 albums
Mile Kitić albums
Grand Production albums